The Croats of Switzerland number between 31,000 and 44,035. 92% of them follow Christianity, mainly Roman Catholicism (which is followed by 95% of them), and 0.4% of them follow Evangelicalism.

Notable people

See also 
 Croatia–Switzerland relations
 Croats
 List of Croats

References

Switzerland
Ethnic groups in Switzerland